The Cambridge Winter Hawks were a Canadian junior ice hockey team based in Cambridge, Ontario, Canada.  They played in the Mid-Western division of the Greater Ontario Junior Hockey League.

History
Created in 1982, the team was made to replace the last Cambridge team that was bought out by the Guelph Platers and moved out of town.  Their first season was in the OHA Junior "A" League.  The Winter Hawks have been a charter member of the Midwestern "B" since 1983, and are currently the 2006 Sutherland Cup Champions, defeating the Niagara Falls Canucks; they also repeated as 2007 Sutherland Cup champions.

The Winter Hawks have applied but were denied to move up to the Junior A Ontario Junior Hockey League for the 2013-14 season.

In 2017 the Cambridge Winter Hawks announced they were parting ways with OHA (but not Hockey Canada) and emphasized that they would no longer be of the GOJHL.  Options being explored included finding a Junior A league, creating their own Jr. A league, but are not considering joining an outlaw league (i.e. GMHL).

Season-by-season record

Playoffs
OJHL Years
1983 Lost Quarter-final
North York Rangers defeated Cambridge Winterhawks 4-games-to-none

Sutherland Cup championships
2000: Cambridge Winter Hawks defeated St. Catharines Falcons 4-games-to-none
2006: Cambridge Winter Hawks defeated Niagara Falls Canucks 4-games-to-1
2007: Cambridge Winter Hawks defeated Strathroy Rockets 4-games-to-none
2013: London Nationals defeated Cambridge Winter Hawks 4-games-to-3

Notable alumni
Tim Brent
John Cullen
Todd Harvey
Jody Hull
Bryan Little
Kirk Maltby
Marty Turco
Scott Walker

References

External links
Winter Hawks Webpage

Sport in Cambridge, Ontario
Ice hockey teams in Ontario
1982 establishments in Ontario
Ice hockey clubs established in 1982
2017 disestablishments in Ontario
Ice hockey clubs disestablished in 2017